The superior labial artery (superior labial branch of facial artery) is larger and more egregious than the inferior labial artery.

It follows a similar course along the edge of the upper lip, lying between the mucous membrane and the orbicularis oris, and anastomoses with the artery of the opposite side.

It supplies the upper lip, and gives off in its course two or three vessels which ascend to the nose; a septal branch ramifies on the nasal septum as far as the point of the nose, and an alar branch supplies the ala of the nose.

See also
Kiesselbach's plexus

Additional images

References

External links
  - "Superficial arteries of the face."
 
 http://www.dartmouth.edu/~humananatomy/figures/chapter_47/47-5.HTM

Arteries of the head and neck